The 1836 United States presidential election in South Carolina took place between November 3 and December 7, 1836, as part of the 1836 United States presidential election. The state legislature chose 11 representatives, or electors to the Electoral College, who voted for President and Vice President.

South Carolina cast 11 electoral votes for the Whig candidate Willie Person Mangum. These electors were chosen by the South Carolina General Assembly, the state legislature, rather than by popular vote.

Results

References

South Carolina
1836
1836 South Carolina elections